Kevin Canty may refer to:

 Kevin Canty (author) (born 1953), American author of novels and short stories
 Kevin Canty (hurler) (born 1986), Irish hurler